The Snake River Complex Fire is a large complex of wildfires burning in Idaho, Washington and Oregon. The fire started near Lewiston, Idaho on July 7, 2021. It burned  before being contained.

Events

July 
The Snake River Complex Fire was first reported on July 7, 2021 at around 6:45 a.m. PDT near Lewiston, Idaho.

Cause 
The cause of the fire is believed to be due to lightning.

Containment 
As of July 17, 2021, the fire was 31% percent contained, and as of August 2, it was 87% contained. It was contained on August 20th.

Impact

Closures and evacuations

See also 

 2021 Oregon Wildifres
 2021 Washington Wildfires
 List of Washington Wildfires
Dry Gulch Fire, another large wildfire burning near the Snake River Complex Fire

References 

2021 wildfires in the United States
June 2021 events in the United States
Wildfires in Washington (state)
Wildfires in Idaho
Wildfires in Oregon
2021 Washington (state) wildfires
2021 Oregon wildfires